Ruse may refer to:

Places
Ruse, Bulgaria, a major city of Bulgaria
Ruse Municipality
Ruse Province
19th MMC – Ruse, a constituency
Ruše, a town and municipality in north-eastern Slovenia
Ruše, Žalec, a small settlement in east-central Slovenia
Ruse, New South Wales, a suburb of Sydney, Australia
Ruse Peak, Antarctica

Art and entertainment
 Ruse (book), Ruse: Undercover with FBI Counterintelligence, an autobiography by Robert Eringer
Ruse (comics), a comic book published by CrossGen
R.U.S.E., a 2010 video game
"Ruse", a song by Chevelle from Hats Off to the Bull
The Ruse, indie rock band based in Los Angeles, California

Education
James Ruse Agricultural High School, a selective high school in Sydney, Australia
University of Ruse, a public university in Ruse, Bulgaria

Other uses
ruse, a deception, an action or plan which is intended to deceive someone, for example a ruse of war.
USS PC-472, a US Navy submarine chaser transferred to the French Navy in 1944 and renamed Le Ruse

People with the name
Austin Ruse, American nonprofit executive and anti-abortion activist
 Elena-Gabriela Ruse (born 1997), Romanian tennis player
 James Ruse (1759–1857), born in Cornwall, transported to New South Wales
 Michael Ruse (1940–), philosopher of science

tr:Ruse